Dickenson may refer to:

Dickenson (surname), list of notable people with the surname
Dickenson County, Virginia, United States
Dickenson Hill Road, Singapore
CS Dickenson, see 
Dickinson College, a private liberal arts college in Carlisle, Pennsylvania, United States

See also
Dickinson (disambiguation)
Dickinson (name)